The Feast of the Pheasant (French: Banquet du Vœu du faisan, "Banquet of the Oath of the Pheasant") was a banquet given by Philip the Good, Duke of Burgundy on 17 February 1454 in Lille, now in France.  Its purpose was to promote a crusade against the Turks, who had taken Constantinople the year before.  The crusade never took place.

There are contemporary accounts of the banquet (notably the Memoirs of Olivier de la Marche, and the Chroniques of Mathieu d'Escouchy), which name and describe in much detail the lavish entertainments staged during the meal and even the various pieces of music performed, perhaps including Dufay's motet Lamentatio sanctae matris ecclesiae Constantinopolitanae. At one point in the entertainment, according to the chronicles, an actor dressed as a woman in white satin clothes, personifying the
Church of Constantinople (according to one hypothesis, played by Olivier de la Marche himself) entered the hall of the banquet riding on an elephant, led by a giant Saracen, to recite a "complaint and lamentation in a piteous and feminine voice" ("commença sa complainte et lamentacion à voix piteuse et femmenine"), requesting aid from the Knights of the Golden Fleece.  It has been surmised that this was the moment when Dufay's motet would have been performed; other authors have conjectured that it was merely a moment of inspiration and that the motet was actually written later.

We are also told which music by Gilles Binchois was performed and of 24 musicians playing inside an enormous pie and a trick with a horse riding backwards.

The oath taken by the participants, the Vœux du faisan ("oath of the pheasant") was in the tradition of the "bird oaths" of Late Medieval France as popularized in the 14th century romance of the Voeux du paon.

See also
 List of dining events

References

Bibliography
Agathe Lafortune-Martel, (1984), Fête noble en Bourgogne au XVe siecle: Le Banquet du Faisan (1454): Aspects politiques, sociaux et culturels  Cahiers d'etudes medievales 8  Paris: Vrin.
Marie-Therèse Caron, Le banquet des voeux du Faisan et la fête de cour bourguignonne, Turnhout, 2003 
Johan Huizinga, The Autumn of the Middle Ages (ch. 3).
"Les historiens du "Banquet des voeux du Faisan"," Melanges d'histoire offerts a Charles Moeller, vol. I, Louvain & Paris 1914, pp

Discography
Le Banquet du Voeu, 1454,  Music at the Court of Burgundy, Ensemble Gilles Binchois – Dominique Vellard, Virgin Classics 91441, Virgin Veritas 59043.

1454 in Europe
1450s in France
History of Lille
Society of France
15th-century crusades
Oaths
European court festivities
Arts in the court of Philip the Good
Dining events
Balls in France